Radio KAOS may refer to:

Radio K.A.O.S., a 1987 concept album by Roger Waters
K.A.O.S. On the Road, a concert tour by Waters in support of the album
KAOS (FM), a radio station licensed to Evergreen State College, Olympia, Washington, United States
Radio Kaos, a Mexican rock band formed in Los Angeles in 1994
Radio Kaos, a fictional radio station of Kaos in Battle Angel Alita

See also 

KAOS (disambiguation)